Mikhail Gandhi is an Indian child actor who has performed in various films and TV series. He started his acting career with small roles in television commercials. His debut film was Telugu-language film Supreme (2016) which was followed by documentary film Sachin: A Billion Dreams (2017) where he played the role of young cricketer Sachin Tendulkar. Later he played roles in Telugu films Hello (2017) and Bharath Ane Nenu (2018).

Filmography

References 

Indian male film actors
Indian male child actors
Year of birth missing (living people)
Living people